The November Mogadishu car bombing occurred on 26 November 2016. At least 20 people were killed by the explosion of a car bomb near a market in the Somali capital Mogadishu. Medical sources told the AFP news agency that the death toll could be as high as 30.

See also
January 2016 Mogadishu attack
February 2016 Mogadishu attack
June 2016 Mogadishu attacks
List of Islamist terrorist attacks
List of mass car bombings
List of terrorist incidents in November 2016
Number of terrorist incidents by country

References

Somali Civil War (2009–present)
Al-Shabaab (militant group) attacks
Islamic terrorist incidents in 2016
Marketplace attacks
Mass murder in 2016
Mass murder in Somalia
November 2016 crimes in Africa
Terrorist incidents in Somalia in 2016
November 2016 events in Africa
21st century in Mogadishu
Terrorist incidents in Mogadishu